Walter McDonald may refer to:

 Walter McDonald (cricketer) (1884–1955), Australian cricketer
 Walter McDonald (politician) (1903–1999), Canadian politician in Manitoba
 Walter McDonald (professor) (1854–1920), Irish Roman Catholic priest, theologian and professor
 William Walter McDonald (1844–1929), Canadian politician from the Northwest Territories
 Walt McDonald (born 1934), Poet Laureate of Texas
 Walt McDonald (American football) (1920–2012), American football defensive back